Rino Mastronardi (born 14 November 1969) is an Italian racing driver currently competing in the Asian Le Mans Series for Rinaldi Racing. Mastronardi has previously competed in several international touring car championships, most notably winning the GT3 class of the Michelin Le Mans Cup in 2020 and the LMGTE class of the European Le Mans Series in 2021, both with Iron Lynx.

Racing Record

Complete 24 Hours of Le Mans results

References

1969 births
Living people
Italian racing drivers
European Le Mans Series drivers
FIA World Endurance Championship drivers
Asian Le Mans Series drivers
Blancpain Endurance Series drivers
Target Racing drivers
AF Corse drivers
24 Hours of Le Mans drivers
24H Series drivers
Le Mans Cup drivers
Iron Lynx drivers